The 2007-08 Irish Ice Hockey League season was the first season of the Irish Ice Hockey League, the top level of ice hockey in Ireland. Five teams participated in the league, and the Dundalk Bulls won the championship.

Regular season

Playoffs

Semifinals
Dundalk Bulls 26 - Latvian Hawks 4
Dublin Rams 4 - Flyers IHC 1

Final
Dundalk Bulls 6 - Dublin Rams 3

External links
Season on SFRP's Hockey Archive

Irish Ice Hockey League seasons
Irish
ice hockey
ice hockey